Kirill Alekseevich Polukhin (born 3 May 1969) is a Soviet and Russian  film, stage, and television actor.

Early life
Polukhin was born in Leningrad, Russian SFSR, Soviet Union (now Saint Petersburg, Russia).

Polukhin was the only family member who had any relation to the arts: his father was a doctor and his mother was an economist. Polukhin worked in an acting studio owned by Zinovy Korogodsky.

Career 
In 1999, he graduated from the Russian State Institute of Performing Arts (course of Andrei Tolubeyev). In the same year, he joined the troupe of Tovstonogov Bolshoi Drama Theater.

Due to his appearance, Polukhin is mainly cast in antagonist roles.

Personal life
Kirill Polukhin is married to an actress Svetlana Strogova and has a son, Innokenty (born in 1998).

Selected filmography
 Secrets of Investigation (2002) as investigator of prosecutor's office
 Streets of Broken Lights (2005) as Samsonov
 The Fall of the Empire (2005) as soldat
 The Priest (2009) as partisan
 The Life and Adventures of Mishka Yaponchik (2010) as Grigory Kotovsky
 Home (2011) as Senior
 Alien District (2011) as Igor Svistunov
 The Major (2013) as Kolya Burlakov
 The Fool (2014) as Matyugin
 Leningrad 46 (2014) as Stepan Zavyalov
 The Method (2014) as Sedoy, a detective
 Battalion (2015) as Zobov
 Ivan (2016) as Ivan
 Raid (2017) as episode
 The Age of Pioneers (2017) as part commander
 Gogol. Viy (2018) as Basavryuk
 The Factory (2018) as Andreich
 Better than Us (2018) as Pavel Varlamov
  Dead Lake (2019) as Smertin
 The Balkan Line (2019) as Barmin
 The Method (2020) as detective
 Streltsov (2020) as an officer in prison
 A Fairy Tale for the Old (2022) as shooter

References

External links

 Kirill Polukhin on KinoPoisk

1969 births
Living people
Russian male film actors
Russian male stage actors
Russian male television actors
20th-century Russian male actors
21st-century Russian male actors
Male actors from Saint Petersburg